Samane may refer to:

Samane Viyaket (1927–2016), Laotian politician
Guhu-Samane language, Trans–New Guinea language